The Abingdon was an English assembled car built in small numbers in 1922 and 1923 in a factory in Tyseley, Birmingham.  It used an 11-9hp 1490 cc 4-cylinder Dorman engine and a 3-speed gearbox. Only 12 were made. Production was hampered by financial difficulties for the Wrigley company, who supplied key components such as the steering gear and three-speed gearbox.

The company also produced Abingdon Motorcycles until 1925. In 1905 and 1906, it had produced the 5 hp (4 kW) AKD tricar.

See also
 List of car manufacturers of the United Kingdom

References

The company was producer of the world's best known adjustable spanner (from www.madeinbirmingham.org)

Vintage vehicles
Defunct motor vehicle manufacturers of England
Defunct companies based in Birmingham, West Midlands

Cars introduced in 1922